Friends Forever: A Novel is a novel by Danielle Steel, published by Delacorte Press in July 2012. The book is Steel's eighty-seventh novel, and (including non-fiction and children's books) her 105th book overall.

Synopsis
This novel tells the story of five friends - Gabby, Billy, Izzie, Andy, and Sean.

Footnotes

2012 American novels
American romance novels

Novels by Danielle Steel
Delacorte Press books